The 2023 XFL Draft was the  player selection process to fill the rosters of the eight teams of the 2020 reboot of the XFL, and the second draft in that league's history following the 2020 draft. The draft was held on November 15–17, 2022, with results released through the XFL's social media channels.

Structure
The XFL 2023 draft pool consists of 1,700 players that are eligible. Of those, 528 players will advance to the preseason rosters. It will follow a "snake" format, with each position phase following a random order set prior to the draft, and that order reversing between odd and even rounds of the phase.

The 2023 XFL Draft will follow the same basic layout as the 2020 XFL Draft: starting quarterbacks will be allocated in a separate process and revealed November 15, while the remaining positions will be separated by position.
November 15
Phase 0: Quarterbacks—2 rounds
November 16
Phase 1: offensive skill positions (running backs, wide receivers, and tight ends)—11 rounds
Phase 2: defensive backs (cornerbacks and safeties)—11 rounds
Phase 3: defensive front seven players (defensive linemen and linebackers)—11 rounds
Phase 4: offensive linemen (offensive tackles, guards, and centers)—11 rounds
November 17
Phase 5: special teams (kicking players, long snappers)—3 rounds
Phase 6: open draft (any position)—11 rounds

A supplemental draft was held on January 1, 2023 to allow players who were obligated to another league at the time of the November draft (this included players from the 2022 USFL season who signed before a loophole in the league's reserve clause was closed, as well as players on National Football League practice squad) to join the league.

Teams will not have any reserve rights to any players they had employed in 2020, and thus all of the league's roster spots will be filled by way of the draft or the supplemental draft.

Phase 0: Tier 1 quarterback allocations

Phase 1: Skill Players

Phase 2: Defensive backs

Phase 3: Defensive front seven

Phase 4: Offensive line

Phase 5: Specialists
The specialist draft consisted of three rounds with a total of 24 players selected. Each team selected a long snapper, a kicker and a punter.

Phase 6: Open draft

Phase 7: Additional quarterback allocations

Supplemental draft 
XFL supplemental draft was held 1 January 2023. The draft consisted of 17 rounds, with a total of 90 players selected. The teams followed a snake-style format with the pick order reversing each round. The selections included 1) players who were previously ineligible to be drafted, and 2) players who were not selected during the XFL Draft November 16-17. NFL Alumni Academy graduates who were not selected will be assigned to teams and instructed to report to training camp with their teammates.

NFL Alumni Academy Player allocation

Player allocations were announced via the XFL Communications Department's Twitter page on January 6. The allocations were announced by team, rather than an order of selections. All teams were allocated ten additional players with the exceptions of the Houston Roughnecks and Vegas Vipers who were allocated nine players.

References

Draft, 2023
XFL Draft, 2023
XFL Draft, 2023
XFL Draft, 2023
Draft
XFL Draft, 2023
American football in Nevada
Enterprise, Nevada
Events in the Las Vegas Valley